Cass Timberlane is the title character in a Sinclair Lewis novel.

Timberlane may also refer to a community or school in the United States:

Communities
Timberlane, Illinois, a village
Timberlane, Louisiana, a census-designated place

Schools
Timberlane Regional High School, Plaistow, New Hampshire
Timberlane Regional Middle School, Plaistow, New Hampshire
Timberlane Middle School, Mercer County, New Jersey

See also
Timberland (disambiguation)
Timberline (disambiguation)